Mitsushige (written: 光茂 or 光重) is a masculine Japanese given name. Notable people with the name include:

, Japanese daimyō
, Japanese samurai and daimyō

Japanese masculine given names